Foreign relations exist between Australia and Solomon Islands. Australia has a High Commission in Honiara and Solomon Islands has a High Commission in Canberra. The two countries are members of the Pacific Islands Forum.

History

In the 1950s, British and Australian government officials discussed transferring sovereignty of the British Solomon Islands to Australia. The Australian external affairs minister Paul Hasluck brought a proposal for a transfer to cabinet in 1956, but it was rejected primarily for reasons of cost.

Under the government of Prime Minister John Howard, Australia's relations with Manasseh Sogavare's Solomon Islands were strained, primarily because of the "Julian Moti affair". Sogavare notably accused Australia of conducting neo-colonialism in the Solomon Islands via RAMSI. On 1 October 2007, the Solomon Islands' Foreign Affairs Minister Patteson Oti addressed the General Assembly of the United Nations, and accused Australia of undermining his country's sovereignty:

Mine is too nationalistic a government to become captive to the fortunes which justify our perpetual retention under siege. My [country's government] remain[s] unmoved by Australian resistance to our attempts to reclaim our sovereignty and independence.

This led Australia to exercise its right of reply, denying the accusation. Relations subsequently improved when both Howard and Sogavare lost office in December 2007, and their successors Kevin Rudd and Derek Sikua immediately set out to improve relations between Canberra and Honiara.

In late March 2022, Australian Foreign Minister Marise Payne and Defence Minister Peter Dutton expressed opposition to a draft security pact between China and the Solomon Islands that would allow Beijing to deploy military forces in the country and establish a military base. Similar concerns about the Sino-Solomon Islands security pact were expressed by the New Zealand Government.
In response, Solomon Islands Prime Minister Manasseh Sogavare defended the security pact with China, criticising the leaking of the document and objecting to the Australian media's coverage of the security pact. In addition, the Chinese Government defended law enforcement and bilateral cooperation with the Solomon Islands and disputed Australian criticism that Beijing was coercing the Solomon Islands.

Australian aid
Australia is a significant foreign aid donor to the Solomon Islands, and the country's main development partner. According to the Australian government, their aid in the Solomon Islands is focused on "improving health, education, water and sanitation, transport, telecommunications, law and justice, rural livelihoods and effective governance." In 2018-19, Australia donated $187 million to the Solomon Islands, making it the second biggest recipient of Australian aid, behind Papua New Guinea, which received $572.2 million in 2018-19.

Australia led other nations as part of the Regional Assistance Mission to Solomon Islands. Over 7,000 Australian Defence Force members have been deployed in the Solomon Islands as part of that mission. In 2013, the Australian government committed $500 million to assisting the Solomon Islands through the regional assistance mission in the following four years. The mission officially ended on 30 June 2017.

In June 2018, the two countries signed an agreement for the sinking of an undersea high speed internet link between the Solomon Islands and the Australian mainland. Though seen as a security issue for Australia, it is believed more than $100 million will come out of Australia's aid budget.

References

 
Solomon Islands
Bilateral relations of the Solomon Islands